Since the inception of the Indian women's football league competition, the Indian Women's League (IWL) in October 2016, 15 players have scored a hat-trick (3 goals or more in a single match). Till 6 February 2020, 32 hat-tricks were scored in the IWL. The first player to achieve the feat was Sasmita Malik of India who scored three times for Rising Student's Club in a 6–1 victory over Aizawl.

Bala Devi scored the most number of hat-tricks in the history of IWL. She achieved the feat 7 times in two seasons; 2017–18 and 2018–19. She is also the only player to have scored multiple hat-tricks in a single match. She has achieved this rare feat twice. She first achieved it while scoring 7 goals for Manipur Police in a 10−0 victory over SAI-STC Cuttack. She achieved the feat again while scoring 6 goals for Manipur Police in a 10−0 victory over Bangalore United. She scored her first three goals at the 3rd, 15th and 16th minutes of the match, thus making her the fastest hat-trick scorer of IWL.

The first non-Indian player to have scored a hat-trick in the IWL was Fazila Ikwaput of Uganda. She scored the hat-trick for Gokulam Kerala in a 6–1 win against Indira Gandhi AS&E. Sabitra Bhandari of Nepal have scored 5 hat-tricks, the only non-Indian to have scored multiple hat-tricks in the IWL.

Hat-tricks 

Result column shows goal tally of player's team first.

Multiple hat-tricks 

Players in bold  are still active in the Indian Women's League.

Hat-tricks by nationality
The following table lists the number of hat-tricks scored by players from a single nation.

See also
 List of Indian Super League hat-tricks
 List of I-League hat-tricks
 List of India women's national football team hat-tricks

References 

Hat-tricks
Indian Women's League
Association football player non-biographical articles